Mathis Gazoa Kippersund Bolly (born 14 November 1990) is a professional footballer who plays as a forward. Bolly made his professional debut for the Norwegian top flight side Lillestrøm. He represented Norway at youth international level, but chose to represent Ivory Coast national.

Club career
Born in Oslo to a Norwegian mother and an Ivorian father, Bolly grew up at Holmlia in Oslo and played youth football for Lyn, Oppsal IL and Holmlia before transferring to Lillestrøm in 2008. He made his debut for the first team in the Tippeligaen match against Stabæk and played two matches in his first season with the club. In the 2009 season, Bolly's second season with Lillestrøm, he played 10 matches in Tippeligaen. Bolly scored his first Tippeligaen goal in the 1–0 victory against Sandefjord on 3 October 2010. During the 2012 season Bolly scored four goals and made four assists. His contract with Lillestrøm lasted till the end of the 2013 season, though he had told the club that he didn't want to renew his contract. Lillestrøm subsequently accepted an offer from Fortuna Düsseldorf and on 2 January 2013, Bolly signed for a three-and-a-half-year contract with the German side.

Bolly made his Bundesliga debut in the match against Mainz 05 when he came on as a substitute. He started the next match against Bayern Munich on 9 March 2013, where he also scored one of Fortuna Düsseldorf's goals in the 3–2 loss. The next week, Bolly scored another goal when Fortuna Düsseldorf drew 1–1 away against VfL Wolfsburg. Fortuna Düsseldorf was relegated after the 2012–13 season, but Bolly stayed with the team when they played in the 2. Bundesliga in the following season.

On 19 February 2019, Bolly joined Molde on a one-year contract. He got his Molde debut on 18 July 2019 when he came on as a 62nd minute substitute in Molde's 0–0 draw away against KR in the 2019–20 UEFA Europa League first qualifying round. On 1 October 2019, Molde announced that they had agreed a contract extension with Bolly that will keep him at the club till the end of the 2022 season.

International career
Bolly played three matches for the Norwegian under-19 team in 2009, and was called up for the under-21 team in February and March 2013. He was also included in the Norwegian preliminary squad for the 2013 UEFA European Under-21 Football Championship, but withdrew from the squad when he in May 2013 was called up for the Ivory Coast national team for the World Cup qualifiers against Gambia and Tanzania. His former manager at Lillestrøm, Henning Berg, stated that it was a big loss for Norway and that Bolly could have been an important player for the national team in the future. He played his first game for the Ivory Coast against Gambia on 8 June 2013. He played his second match for Ivory Coast in the friendly match against Mexico in August 2013, playing alongside Didier Drogba. Bolly was an unused substitute in the decisive play-off match against Senegal when Ivory Coast qualified for the 2014 World Cup. He was selected to represent the Ivory Coast at the 2014 Fifa World Cup in Brazil, and got his World Cup debut as a second-half substitute in the Ivory Coast's second group game against Colombia.

Style of play
When he joined Lillestrøm in 2008, Bolly ran 40 meters in 4.77 seconds. After the 2009 season, he ran 40 meters in 4.61 seconds, which makes him the second fastest Tippeligaen player ever, only beaten by Luton Shelton. When EA Sports released the video game FIFA 14, Bolly was the fastest player in the game in terms of sprint speed. As of FIFA 17, he still holds this achievement. However, in the FIFA 18 edition, Pierre-Emerick Aubameyang replaces him as the fastest player in the game in terms of sprint speed and acceleration.

Career statistics

Honours
Molde
Eliteserien: 2019
Norwegian Cup: 2021–22

References

External links
 

1990 births
Living people
Footballers from Oslo
Ivorian footballers
Ivory Coast international footballers
Norwegian footballers
Ivorian people of Norwegian descent
Norwegian people of Ivorian descent
Association football midfielders
Holmlia SK players
Lillestrøm SK players
Molde FK players
Eliteserien players
Fortuna Düsseldorf players
SpVgg Greuther Fürth players
Bundesliga players
2. Bundesliga players
Ivorian expatriate footballers
Norwegian expatriate footballers
Ivorian expatriate sportspeople in Germany
Norwegian expatriate sportspeople in Germany
Expatriate footballers in Germany
2014 FIFA World Cup players